Leonid Yakovlevich Gozman (13 July 1950, Leningrad) is a Russian politician and president of the all-Russian public movement Union of Right Forces.

Biography
He was born on 13 July 1950 in Leningrad. In 1976, he graduated from the Faculty of Psychology of Moscow State University with a PhD and started teaching there the same year.

He was the co-chair of the party Just Cause from 2008 to June 2011. 

In September 2014, he signed a statement to "Stop the aggressive adventure: To withdraw from the territory of Ukraine, Russian troops and stop the propaganda, financial and military support to the separatists in the South-East of Ukraine." He again signed an anti-war petition in January 2022 during the 2021–2022 Russo-Ukrainian crisis.

On 25 July 2022, he was detained by Russian police in Moscow "over his alleged failure to inform the authorities swiftly enough about his citizenship of Israel". 

In August 2022, he was arrested for 15 days based on a Facebook posting he made in 2022 with the following text:

Hitler was an absolute evil, but Stalin was even worse. The SS were criminals, but the NKVD were even more terrible, because the Chekists murdered their own. Hitler unleashed a war against humanity; the communists declared total war against their own people.

Bibliography

References

1950 births
Living people
Politicians from Saint Petersburg
Russian Jews
Union of Right Forces politicians
Russian dissidents
Moscow State University alumni
People listed in Russia as media foreign agents
Russian anti-war activists
People listed in Russia as foreign agents
Israeli people of Russian-Jewish descent
Russian activists against the 2022 Russian invasion of Ukraine